South Miami is a city in Miami-Dade County, Florida, United States, in the Miami metropolitan area. The population was 12,026 as of the 2020 census.

History
South Florida had been roamed by Native Americans (Tequesta, Calusa, and Jaega), probably for centuries, before white pioneers advanced through Little Hunting Ground (later known as Miami's Coconut Grove neighborhood) to Big Hunting Ground (now known as the Cutler neighborhood of Palmetto Bay).

Wilson Alexander Larkins (1860–1946) was 36 years old when he, his wife (Katie Estelle Burtashaw) and five children, and their livestock arrived in Fort Dallas (now the Lummus Park Historic District of Miami) in 1896. He purchased property west of Red Road and Sunset Drive, where he built a home and barn. He also built the first general store east of that area in 1898 at what is known today as Cartagena Plaza or Cocoplum Circle (actually in Coral Gables). As the community grew, he established a post office in the community. Larkins became the first postmaster, a role he held for sixteen years; he named the area "Manila", but the majority of the settlers, who began building homes around his store, preferred the name of "Larkins" in his honor.

A depot was placed along the Florida East Coast Railway in 1904, and in the same year, John Moses Dowling built the first house within what is now South Miami city limits. His son-in-law opened the first store on the west side of the tracks, called the White Palace Grocery.

Other prominent historic families have historic buildings and streets named for them, such as Dorn Avenue (Southwest 59th Avenue) and the Shelley Building, among others. Harold W. Dorn and his brother Robert moved to the area in 1910; their primary interest was growing mango and avocado. Mary E. Dorn was the first president of the Cocoplum Thimble Club, the first Women's club in Larkins. In 1925, the Dorn brothers built the Riviera Theatre at 5700 South Dixie Highway; in 1934, Charles T. Fuchs moved his Holsum Bakery from Homestead to South Miami and turned the Riviera Theatre Building into a bakery.

The first African-American to purchase land in the Larkins area was Marshall Williamson, who moved there from Madison, Florida. He built his home at 6500 SW 60th Avenue and allowed it to be used for church services even before the construction was completed. In 1916, he donated land for the St. John's AME (African Methodist Episcopal) Church, one of Larkins' first churches and the first church in the black community; it is located at 6461 SW 59th Place. Later, Williamson also donated land for the J. R. E. Lee School. Because of his generosity, the black neighborhood became known as Madison Square, after Williamson's hometown. Williamson died in 1972. Named after him is Marshall Williamson Park, at 6125 SW 68 Street.

In 1926, area residents wanted to incorporate their area, and because of the booming city to the north of them, they chose the name of "Town of South Miami". The original town boundaries were Red Road on the east, Kendall Drive to the south, Palmetto Road to the west (now Palmetto Expressway), and Bird Road and Miller Drive to the north. The year 1926 also saw the first street lighting and the first incoming class of freshmen at the newly chartered University of Miami campus, which abuts the city of South Miami eastern boundary along Red Road (SW 57th Avenue). Also founded with a university theme that same year was the Cambridge Lawns neighborhood of South Miami, situated just  from the university campus. The neighborhood's Cambridge Lawns Historic District, some 30 homes in the Tudor Revival and Mediterranean revival style completed in 1928, were granted historic recognition by the City of South Miami in 2005.

Also in 1926, South Miami received extensive damage from the 1926 Miami hurricane. The town's leaders asked Congress to "relieve the people of their income tax for the current year," but federal assistance was not forthcoming. The Florida East Coast Railway station burned down, leaving the town without a station for many years. Residents suffered storm damage again from Hurricane Andrew in 1992 and from Hurricane Bonnie (1998).

On June 25, 1927, W. A. Forster was sworn in as South Miami's first mayor.

In 1933, the original six square miles of South Miami were reduced to just over three miles (5 km) due to an effort to reduce municipal responsibilities. The city's size was reduced again in 1937, and many of the northern city residents sued to get out of the city. This is why the city of South Miami has the most irregular boundaries of any city in Miami-Dade County today.

Of mid-century South Miami, local historian Donna Shelley writes:

Construction of the current City Hall building was approved by referendum in 1955. Designed by architect Henry George Fink, the governmental seat on Sunset Drive was dedicated in October 1956 by Mayor Paul U. Tevis.

Jack Block was elected mayor of the city in 1968, and was thereafter re-elected every two years until 1984 when, as he told interviewer Gregory W. Bush, "I started to not enjoy it as much." In that interview, for the University of Miami Oral History Program, he gave snapshots of South Miami history when he told Bush (a history professor at the University of Miami),

In 1990, Catherine (Rutherford) McCann (1933–2009) was elected as South Miami's first female Mayor, and was re-elected in 1992. She was responsible for the clean-up of South Miami after Hurricane Andrew; the Miami Herald wrote, "She had an encyclopedic knowledge of the South Miami city charter. She pushed for affordable housing and responsible development."

In 2000, South Miami joined other municipalities in the country in forming city partnerships to help foster cultural and economic development between cities around the world. South Miami is a member of Sister Cities International and formed relationships with the cities of Grand Turk in Turks and Caicos Islands and Basseterre in Saint Kitts and Nevis.

According to reporting by SOMI magazine, a local publication, during early October 2018, "[o]n August 21, 2018, in the City of South Miami Commission Chambers the forging of a 'Sister-City' between the City of South Miami, Florida, and the Municipio de Medellin, Colombia, was formalized."

Geography
South Miami is located at  (25.710279, −80.295170). It is bordered to the east by the city of Coral Gables, to the south by the town of Pinecrest, to the west by unincorporated Glenvar Heights, and to the north by unincorporated Coral Terrace. U.S. Route 1 (South Dixie Highway) passes through the city, leading northeast  to Downtown Miami and southwest  to Homestead.

Surrounding areas
  Glenvar Heights, Unincorporated Miami-Dade County, Coral Terrace
  Coral Terrace    Coral Gables
 Unincorporated Miami-Dade County, Glenvar Heights   Coral Gables, Unincorporated Miami-Dade County
  Glenvar Heights, Pinecrest    Coral Gables
  Glenvar Heights, Pinecrest

Demographics

2020 census

As of the 2020 U.S. census, there were 12,026 people, 4,431 households, and 2,641 families residing in the city.

2010 census

As of 2010, there were 5,174 households, out of which 9.2% were vacant. In 2000, 26.1% had children under the age of 18 living with them, 40.4% were married couples living together, 15.2% had a female householder with no husband present, and 39.7% were non-families. 30.7% of all households were made up of individuals, and 9.0% had someone living alone who was 65 years of age or older. The average household size was 2.47 and the average family size was 3.15.

2000 census
In 2000, the city population was spread out, with 22.7% under the age of 18, 8.2% from 18 to 24, 31.8% from 25 to 44, 23.7% from 45 to 64, and 13.6% who were 65 years of age or older. The median age was 37 years. For every 100 females, there were 92.8 males. For every 100 females age 18 and over, there were 90.4 males.

In 2000, the median income for a household in the city was $42,488, and the median income for a family was $57,791. Males had a median income of $37,250 versus $29,772 for females. The per capita income for the city was $24,526. About 8.9% of families and 17.1% of the population were below the poverty line, including 22.0% of those under age 18 and 13.4% of those age 65 or over.

As of 2000, speakers of English as a first language accounted for 59.69% of residents, while Spanish speakers consisted of 37.45%, and speakers of French as the first language made up 1.26% of the population.

Economy
The South Miami business community is served by Chamber South with offices at 6410 S.W. 80 Street in South Miami, and by the Red Sunset Merchants Association of South Miami.

The Consulate-General of Mexico in Miami is located at 5975 Southwest 72nd Street (Sunset Drive) in South Miami.

The nine-acre property site of the Holsum Bakery was for decades afterward known as the Bakery Center to the local residents, and various businesses came and went on that site long after Holsum was gone.

A large complex called, in fact, the Bakery Center, a $35 million project, was proposed in 1982. It was built and opened in 1985, but it was not popular and was demolished in 1996. South Miami residents complained about the architecture, which seemed closed from pedestrians, elitist, and far too tall for a town that liked small, homey buildings and mom-and-pop shops. (Historian Donna Shelley wrote an essay about it entitled "From Baking Dough, To Spending Dough, To Losing Dough"; The New York Times wrote in 1996 that "few retail projects failed as badly as the Bakery Center".) Perhaps the one admired feature was on the outside: an enormous mural by Richard Haas. The investors were never able to find enough small businesses to rent all available spaces in the monolithic building. The consistently successful business, an IMAX theater, was undervalued and closed.

In the 1990s, a large shopping mall called The Shops at Sunset Place was built on the site a retail/entertainment center with a wide, welcoming entrance. The mall had many anchor stores, including Barnes & Noble (which has good community outreach programs), The Gap, Urban Outfitters, Victoria's Secret, an AMC Theatres site with 24 movie theaters, and restaurants like Johnny Rockets; but several have closed (including The Gap, Victoria's Secret, and Johnny Rockets). Food is available from restaurants (such as sidewalk crêpe makers), and it is a popular teenage hangout.

The mall has its detractors. Gabriel Lopez-Bernal, an urban planner praised by the Miami New Times for his blogging on "civic discourse", wrote: "Unlike its predecessor, Sunset Place was designed to be an open-aired Mediterranean community, incorporating former mall aspects like big boxed anchor tenants with street-level restaurants, faux cityscapes, and even a few residential units. The center was originally envisioned to be an entertainment center, but the quick failure of some of the theme restaurants and IMAX Theater, quickly changed intended target use. Since its inception, the mall has struggled to maintain a strong and lasting business base.")

In 2015, The Shops at Sunset Place was acquired for $110.2 million by the joint venture of Federal Realty Investment Trust (NYSE: FRT), Coconut Grove-based Grass River Property, and Miami Beach-based Comras Co. The mall is, thus, under new management and has been seeking to redevelop the site with plans for a new hotel and other improvements.

Transportation
South Miami is served by Metrobus throughout the area, and by the Miami Metrorail, connecting the city to Downtown Kendall, Downtown Miami, and the Miami Intermodal Center at Miami International Airport. Metrorail is available at:

  South Miami (SW 72nd Street and U.S. 1)

The city provides a free shuttle service with nine designated stops on a two-mile loop within the city's Downtown area during specified hours on Tuesdays to Saturdays (no service on Sundays and Mondays).

Culture 
The city has numerous parks and a vibrant downtown filled with historic buildings, restaurants and unique shops. Much of South Miami stretches down U.S. 1, along which it features a wide variety of retail stores and restaurants on long-owned real estate or in newer shopping plazas. The South Miami Branch library of the Miami-Dade Public Library System is open 6 days a week and offers a large children's room, as well as (for a small branch) an extensive collection of DVDs and large-print books.

Music
Bougainvillea's Old Florida Tavern offers early-to-late-night taped and live music for dancing, as well as a variety of beers, wines, and cocktails, including bar foods, and a "Lady's Night" on Wednesdays. Similarly, the very popular, likewise indoor-outdoor Deli Lane Cafe & Tavern Miami is a large building containing a restaurant on one side, with sidewalk dining, and a stage for live musicians in the pool hall on the other side. 

The major mall of South Miami, The Shops at Sunset Place, has hosted "National Talent Search TV Showcase Miami Auditions."

Parks
South Miami has a number of parks, including:

All-America Park, a passive park providing a natural setting with native trees and picnic tables
Brewer Park, which has tennis, handball, and basketball courts, as well as a playground area and picnic area
Dante Fascell Park
Dison Park
Dog Park
Fuchs-Park-5 Fuchs Park, a natural area with a fountain in the pond, where the ducks are friendly and pleased to be fed 
Jean Willis Park (sometimes also referred to as the Jean H. Willis Flowering Tree Park), a small area next to the South Miami Police Department featuring a gazebo, picnic benches and a variety of native flowering trees and for which South Miami Senior High School students constructed a pair of trellises to anchor both ends of the park in 2013;
Marshall Williamson Park, which has tennis courts and a gazebo 
Murray Park (adjacent to the Gibson-Bethel Community Center)), which has lighted basketball courts, a T-ball field, two soccer fields, and a flag football field
Palmer-Park Palmer Park with fields for playing baseball and T-Ball (including through an organized league, the South Miami Youth Baseball League), softball, flag football, and soccer 
South Miami Park
Van Smith Park, a natural hammock park

In 2017, the City of South Miami adopted a Parks and Recreation Master Plan which is a long-range planning document that is meant to help shape the direction, development and delivery of the city's parks and recreation system over an 8- to 10-year period from adoption. According to the City of South Miami's website, "[t]he purpose of this plan is to advance the mission and vision of the Parks and Recreation Department to further the establishment of a high quality parks system and maximize the effectiveness of the department and its resources."

Media
South Miami is served by the Miami market for local radio and television. Three newspapers in South Miami include the hyperlocal South Miami News, which is part of the Community Newspapers chain, the Miami Herald, which publishes a weekly zoned "Neighbors" section serving South Miami and adjacent communities, and the weekly Miami New Times. Long-time South Miami resident John Edward Smith (image marketing and business development consultant) publishes SOMI Magazine every two months, whose "About SOMI" web page states "balances hometown interest while promoting the many businesses located in the South Miami Town Center."

Cuisine
South Miami has a diverse offering in its restaurants. Dara Smith and Olee Fowler wrote in January 2020, "Not historically top of mind as one of the city's major food destinations, South Miami's culinary scene is slowly taking shape. From fine dining to fast casual, [there are] can't miss food and drink spots."

There are many Japanese restaurants with sushi bars; the popular but troubled Kyojin Japanese Buffet is now closed. Italian restaurants are also easy to find, such as Macaluso's & Co., an Italian-American Market and Mi'talia Kitchen & Bar. Cuban restaurants include Casa Cuba and the Mojita Grill.

The Deli Lane Cafe & Sunset Tavern, a family-friendly eatery with outdoor seating and a separate pool-hall room for live music and large-screen sports TV channels, offers a variety of American and ethnic foods. Their menu caters to nearly all palates, with appetizers ranging from potato skins to hummus platters and fruit trays, and meals including cold and hot breakfasts, quesadillas, wraps, quiches, sandwiches, sliders, pasta dishes, stir-fry dishes, large plates of chicken, fish, or steak, and desserts as well as a wine menu. Also popular are the Two Chefs Restaurant and the Whisk, the latter of which is rated #1 by the TripAdvisor site. One can also find French dining (sandwiches, salads, dinners, French wines, and desserts) at the Cafe Bonjour on U.S. Route 1. There are popular lamb and duck meals alongside the steak and chicken at the Cafe Pastis, served up by its French chefs. Le Royal French Bakery, which used to offer fresh breads, pastries, and other treats and received high marks ("Miami's best croissant") from the Miami New Times has closed. There is Cuban cuisine at Casacuba, formerly known as Casa Larios Restaurant, and Portuguese cuisine at the Old Lisbon–Sunset. Khoury's Mediterranean Restaurant offers Mediterranean/Lebanese food, and Marhaba Mediterranean Cuisine is in the heart of Downtown South Miami, just north of the Shops at Sunset Place mall.

Education 
Miami-Dade County Public Schools serves South Miami. 
 South Miami K–8 Center (an expressive arts magnet school)
 South Miami Middle Community School (Center for the Arts)
 South Miami Senior High School (Unincorporated Miami-Dade County)

South Miami is also home to the Miami Conservatory (now known as the Thomas Armour Youth Ballet). Founded in 1949, it is Miami's oldest and best known ballet school.

Government

Structure 
South Miami uses a city manager form of government. The Commission sets the policies and the City Manager acts as the chief executive. Commissioners are elected to four-year terms and the Mayor is elected to a two-year term. The Mayor heads the meeting and previously made appointments, with approval by the commission, to various city boards; however this provision was modified to give all commissioners the right to appoint with consent of the board on February 9, 2010. Elections are held on the second Tuesday in February in even numbered years for the Mayor and half of the Commissioners. The Commissioner receiving the most votes is also given the title of Vice Mayor for the first two years of the term. The next election is scheduled for 2022.

South Miami City Government as of February 2020 includes:

 Mayor: Dr. Sally B. Philips, PhD (Election 2022)
 Vice Mayor: Robert "Bob" Welsh (Vice Mayor until 2022, Commissioner until 2024)
 Commissioner: Walter Harris (Election 2022)
 Commissioner: Luis Gil (Election 2022)
 Commissioner: Josh Liebman (Election 2024)
 City Manager: Shari Kamali

South Miami City Government as of February 2012:
 Mayor: Philip K. Stoddard (Election 2014)
 Vice Mayor: Walter Harris (Vice Mayor until 2016, Commissioner until 2018)
 Commissioner: Robert Welsh] (Election 2016)
 Commissioner: Gabriel Edmund (Election 2014)
 Commissioner: Josh Liebman (Election 2016)
 City Manager: Steven Alexander

Recent election results 
Elections Results for February 11, 2020

Mayor of South Miami
Bruce B. Baldwin 75
Horace G. Feliu 496
Mark Lago 484
Sally B. Philips 739
Lina Sierra 380

Commissioner Group II
Cindy Franz 312
Levy Kelly 610
Josh Liebman 1,136

Commissioner Group III
Bob Welsh 1,552

Charter Amendment
Amend Charter Auditor Term Limit
Yes 1,145
No 907

Also, on February 12, 2020 (the day after the most recent elections), Bob Welsh was appointed as the Vice Mayor until the next City elections in February 2022.

South Miami Hospital 
South Miami Hospital, located at 62nd Avenue (Paul Tevis Road) and U.S. Route 1, opened in 1960 as a 100-bed hospital and currently serves 467 beds. It is one of seven hospitals in the Baptist Health South Florida system. The hospital was recognized as a Magnet Hospital for Nursing Excellence in 2004 and again in 2008, by the American Nurses Credentialing Center. It was also on Solucient's list of top 100 hospitals in the country and earned the Florida Governor's Sterling Award in 2010. It was named the No. 1 hospital in South Florida by U.S. News & World Report in 2012, and ranked No. 42 in the country in geriatrics and No. 47 in orthopedics. The Hospital features an addiction treatment program, a cardiac catheterization lab, a diabetes program and a full oncology department as well as the center for Robotic Surgery, the Center for Women and Infants, South Miami Heart Center and a Level III Neonatal Intensive Care Unit. The Hospital earned $35.5 million in 2012.

Notable residents
Rodney Mandelstam, 1960 Wimbledon Boys tennis champion

References

External links

 

Cities in Miami-Dade County, Florida
1927 establishments in Florida
Populated places established in 1927
Cities in Florida